Cleghorn Glen is a site of special scientific interest which lies outside Lanark and Cleghorn in South Lanarkshire, Scotland. It is one of the six ancient woodlands, along with Cartland Craigs, Falls of Clyde, Chatelherault, Nethan Gorge and Mauldslie Woods, which make up the Clyde Valley Woodlands National Nature Reserve.

Gallery

References

Lanark
Clyde Valley Woodlands National Nature Reserve
Sites of Special Scientific Interest in Scotland